Indexi was a Bosnian and former Yugoslav rock band popular in Yugoslavia. It formed in 1962 in Sarajevo, Bosnia and Herzegovina, and disbanded in 2001 when singer Davorin Popović died. Some of their most notable songs are  "Svijet u kome živim" and "Negdje u kraju, u zatišju" with lyrics by Želimir Altarac Čičak, "Plima", "Sve ove godine", "Sanjam" and "Bacila je sve niz rijeku", which was later covered by many other ex-Yugoslavian groups, notably Crvena jabuka.
 
Indexi formed in 1962, and their name was derived from the "Indeks" which was a student's grade log. They began by making instrumental covers of popular hits, but in 1967 started composing. They were known as the "Pioneers of Psychedelic Rock", and were inspired by many bands like the Beatles, Yes, and The Guess Who.

Line-up

Members

 Ismet Nuno Arnautalić, rhythm guitar (1962. - 1969.)
 Slobodan Bobo Misaljević, solo guitar (1962. - 1965.)
 Đorđe Uzelac, keyboards (1962. - 1965.)
 Šefo Akšamija, bass (1962. - 1965.)
 Nedo Hadžihasanović, drums (1962. - 1963.)
 Alija Hafizović, vocals (occasionally 1963. – 1964.)
 Davorin Popović, vocals (1964. - 2001; his death)
 Đorđe Kisić, drums (1964. – 1968. / 1977. – 1991. / 1999. – 2001.)
 Fadil Redžić, bass (1965. - 1996.)
 Slobodan Bodo Kovačević, solo guitar (1965. - 2001.)
 Kornelije Kovač, keyboards (1967. – 1968.)
 Đorđe Novković, keyboards (1968. – 1969. / 1973.)
 Miroslav Šaranović, drums (1968. – 1973.)
 Ranko Rihtman, keyboards (1969. – 1970. / later: permanent associate member)
 Vlado Pravdić, keyboards (1971. – 1973.)
 Enco Lesić, klavijature (1971. – 1972. / 1975.)
 Miroslav Maraus, keyboards (1974.)
 Milić Vukašinović, drums (1974. – 1975.)
 Nenad Jurin, keyboards (1976. – 1996.)
 Perica Stojanović, drums (1976.)
 Sinan Alimanović, keyboards (1980. – 1983. / 1997. – 2001.)
 Peco Petej, drums (1995. – 2001.)
 Sanin Karić, bass (1996. – 1997.)
 Davor Črnigoj, bass (1998. – 2001.)

Discography

Studio albums

EPs and singles

Live albums

Compilations 
 Pružam ruke (1967)
 Jutro će promijeniti sve (1968)
 Krivac si ti (1972)
 Indexi (1977)
 Retrospektiva (1979)
 Sve ove godine  (1986)
 Best of Indexi 1962–2001 2 CD compilation (2001)

NOTE: A large number of compilations has been released in period between 1981 and 1996

See also
 Indexi (award), the Bosnian music award named after them

External links
 ProgArchives article
 
 
 Indexi Lyrics

Musical groups established in 1962
Musical groups disestablished in 2001
Bosnia and Herzegovina rock music groups
Bosnia and Herzegovina musical groups
Bosnia and Herzegovina progressive rock groups
Yugoslav rock music groups
Yugoslav progressive rock groups
Indexi Award winners
1962 establishments in Yugoslavia
2001 disestablishments in Bosnia and Herzegovina